Fisherground railway station, also known as Fisherground Halt, is on the  gauge Ravenglass & Eskdale Railway in Cumbria, England. Its main purpose is to serve the adjoining camp site.

The water tank was installed in the days of the 3ft gauge railway, and was the main watering point for locos on the railway.  The tank continued to be used by the 15 inch gauge railway into the preservation era, although it has now fallen into disuse.

The station may be accessed by a public footpath that starts at the campsite, goes through the campsite and crosses the line, where the station is. The footpath then goes on to Miteadale. It is a request stop only.  

Accessibility
Due to the railway station being on a public footpath, which is not accessible to the disabled, wheelchair users are not permitted to alight here.

Gallery

References

Heritage railway stations in Cumbria
Ravenglass and Eskdale Railway